Wornum is a surname, which may refer to

 George Grey Wornum, (1888–1957), British architect
 Michael Wornum (d. 1995), British-born American politician
 Ralph Nicholson Wornum, (1812–1877), English art historian
 Robert Wornum, (1780–1852), English piano maker

English-language surnames